Chalciope pusilla is a moth of the family Noctuidae first described by William Jacob Holland in 1894. It is found in Gabon and South Africa.

References

Catocalinae
Insects of West Africa
Fauna of Gabon
Fauna of Mauritania
Moths of Africa